Upernavik Icefjord (also: Ikeq, Aappilattup Ikera) is a fjord in Avannaata municipality in northwestern Greenland.

Geography 
The head of the fjord is located at the mainland of Greenland, at the front of Upernavik Glacier.

In the northeast, a chain of larger islands flank the fjord, from east to west: Maniitsoq Island, Puugutaa Island, Sisuarissut Island, Qaneq Island, and Tussaaq Island.

The chain of islands bounding the fjord from the southwest consists of mostly small islands and skerries. The major islands are, from east to west: Uilortussoq Island, Qeqertarsuaq Island, and Aappilattoq Island. Further to the northwest of Aappilattoq, the islands become progressively smaller.

References 

Fjords of the Upernavik Archipelago